V V Brown has released three studio albums to date.

Studio albums

Singles

As lead artist

As featured artist

References

External links

Discographies of British artists
Pop music discographies